Elvin may refer to:
 Elvin (given name)
 Elvin (surname)
 Elvin (service), a distributed event routing service
 Elvin!, a 1968 album by Elvin Jones

See also
 
 
 Alvin (disambiguation)
 Elfin (disambiguation)
 Elvan (disambiguation)
 Elven (disambiguation)